BDC Marcpol was a Polish UCI Continental cycling team.

Major wins
2011
Overall Dookoła Mazowsza, Robert Radosz
2012
Puchar Ministra Obrony Narodowej, Damian Walczak
2013
Overall Memoriał Andrzeja Trochanowskiego, Konrad Dąbkowski
Overall Dookoła Mazowsza, Marcin Sapa
2014
Overall Memoriał Andrzeja Trochanowskiego, Kamil Gradek
Visegrad 4 Bicycle Race-GP Slovakia, Paweł Bernas
Visegrad 4 Bicycle Race-GP Hungary, Paweł Bernas
Overall Tour de Serbie, Jarosław Kowalczyk
Stage 2, Jarosław Kowalczyk
Memorial im. J. Grundmanna J. Wizowskiego, Błażej Janiaczyk
Stage 2 Course de la Solidarité Olympique, Kamil Gradek
Stage 6 Dookoła Mazowsza, Eryk Laton
Overall Tour of China I, Kamil Gradek
Stage 1, Paweł Bernas
Stage 3, Kamil Gradek

References

Defunct cycling teams based in Poland
Cycling teams based in Poland
Cycling teams established in 2011
Cycling teams disestablished in 2014
UCI Continental Teams (Europe)